Kurpeh (also Romanized as Kūrpeh) is a village in Iran, located in Sanjabi Rural District, Kuzaran District, Kermanshah County, Kermanshah Province. At the 2006 census, its population was 39, in 9 families.

References 

Populated places in Kermanshah County